Pia T. Glover-Rolle (born 18 April 1977) is a Bahamian Progressive Liberal Party politician, entrepreneur, and philanthropist who has been serving as the Bahamian Minister of State for Public Service since 23 September 2021 and the Member of Parliament from Golden Gates. Glover Rolle defeated FNM incumbent Michael Foulkes in the 2021 general election.

Career 
Glover-Rolle is the Founder of PTG Marketing & Modeling Agency and  Model and Talent Showcase of the Islands (Island MMTS).

Glover-Rolle was ratified as the PLP candidate for the Golden Gates constituency in March 2021. She unseated FNM incumbent Michael Foulkes. After the election, she was appointed Minister of State for the Public Service by new prime minister Philip "Brave" Davis. Glover-Rolle was officially sworn in to parliament on 6 October 2021. She apart of the largest number of females to serve in a Bahamian parliament.

Personal life 
Glover-Rolle has been married for over 20 years and has three daughters.

Electoral History

References 

Living people
1977 births
People from Nassau, Bahamas
Members of the Parliament of the Bahamas
21st-century Bahamian women politicians
21st-century Bahamian politicians
Women government ministers of the Bahamas
Government ministers of the Bahamas
Progressive Liberal Party politicians